Sedico is a comune (municipality) in the Province of Belluno in the Italian region Veneto, located about  north of Venice and about  west of Belluno.

Sedico borders the following municipalities: Belluno, Gosaldo, La Valle Agordina, Limana, Longarone, Mel, Rivamonte Agordino, Santa Giustina, Sospirolo, Trichiana.

Demographic evolution

References

Cities and towns in Veneto